Northern Lights is a 1978 independent film that dramatizes the founding of the Nonpartisan League in North Dakota, a populist political movement in the American Midwest in the early 1900s.

Production
The film was produced, directed, written and edited by John Hanson and Rob Nilsson, and starred Joe Spano, Robert Behling, Susan Lynch and Michel Wagner. It was filmed on location in North Dakota during the fall and winter of 1977, and used many locals as extras.

The filmmakers filmed in grainy black-and-white 16mm as a conscious rejection of Hollywood production values, and about a third of the dialogue is in Norwegian. Judy Irola's cinematography has been compared favorably to Days of Heaven.

Due to the extreme cold winter weather, with temperatures reaching as low as –40, many of the outdoor scenes had to be shot in short bursts, as cameras and other equipment only functioned for a short time before freezing up.

Accolades
The film was awarded the Caméra d'Or at the 1979 Cannes Film Festival for best first feature film (defined as "the first feature film for theatrical screening (whatever the format; fiction, documentary or animation) of 60 minutes or more in length, by a director who has not made another film of 60 minutes or more in length and released theatrically."

See also
American Playhouse (which aired the film a decade later)
Ingmar Bergman 
Social realism

References

External links
 
 Cannes Film Festival at IMDb
 John Hanson: Northern Lights posted by Prairie Public on their official YouTube channel

1978 films
1970s English-language films
1978 drama films
American black-and-white films
Films set in North Dakota
Films shot in North Dakota
North Dakota culture
American drama films
Films directed by Rob Nilsson
Caméra d'Or winners
Nonpartisan League
Films set in the 1900s
American Playhouse
1970s American films